Welches is an unincorporated community in Clackamas County, Oregon, United States. It is located within the Mount Hood Corridor between Zigzag and Wemme along U.S. Route 26. It is one of the many communities that make up the Villages at Mount Hood.

History
The community was named after Samuel Welch, a homesteader from Virginia who settled near Welches Creek in 1882 with his son, William, after the death of Samuel's wife. Samuel Welch died in 1898.

A post office was established in the village in 1905, and in 1909, a hotel was constructed, that ran until 1917; the hotel was eventually replaced by nine cottages. Today a hotel and golf resort is located in the village, complete with croquet courts. Welches is home to the Hoodland library, operated by the city of Sandy.

Gallery

See also
 Mount Hood Village CDP
 Village (Oregon)
 Library Information Network of Clackamas County (background on the Hoodland library)

References

External links
 

Portland metropolitan area
Unincorporated communities in Clackamas County, Oregon
1905 establishments in Oregon
Populated places established in 1905
Unincorporated communities in Oregon